Alliance for Romania (ApR) was a political party in Romania active during the late 1990s and early 2000s which was headed by Teodor Meleșcanu. It was a splinter faction of the Party of Social Democracy in Romania (PDSR; later on PSD) which subsequently got absorbed by the National Liberal Party (PNL).

History 

The party was founded in 1997, having a centrist ideology marked by social democracy, social liberalism, and third way politics (at least theoretically). From 1997 up until 2001, it conserved this ideology. However, between 2001 and 2002 it switched, at least theoretically (on paper), to a centre-right ideology, before eventually being absorbed by the National Liberal Party (PNL). Given its relatively short political existence, the party only contested the 2000 local elections and 2000 general elections, both with modest electoral results, further polarizing the confused electorate of the Romanian right.

References 

Social democratic parties in Romania
1997 establishments in Romania